The Gilliece Bridge was a historic structure located west of Bluffton, Iowa, United States. In 1872 Winneshiek County started to replace its older short span timber and stone bridges. This Bowstring through arch-truss bridge was designed, fabricated, and built by the Wrought Iron Bridge Company of Canton, Ohio in 1874 for $6,969.47. Thomas Dwyer, a local stonemason, built the masonry abutments. The bridge was listed on the National Register of Historic Places in 1998. The bridge was destroyed in May 2017 by an overweight truck which was driven onto it despite the posted weight limit of three tons.

References

Bridges completed in 1874
Bridges in Winneshiek County, Iowa
National Register of Historic Places in Winneshiek County, Iowa
Road bridges on the National Register of Historic Places in Iowa
Truss bridges in Iowa
Wrought iron bridges in the United States
Bowstring truss bridges in the United States